This is a list of seasons completed by the Columbus Destroyers. The Destroyers were a professional arena football franchise of the Arena Football League (AFL), based in Columbus, Ohio. The team was established in 1999 as the Buffalo Destroyers. Though the Destroyers have never had a winning season in the regular season, the franchise has made the playoffs three times in its history. While in Buffalo, the Destroyers lost both playoff games in which they played. Following the 2003 season, the franchise's then owner Mark Hamister announced that he was moving the team to Columbus. The move was due to Mr. Hamister losing his bid to buy the Buffalo Sabres. If he would have been able to purchase the Sabres he would have had 3 teams in the arena (Sabres NHL, Bandits NLL, Destroyers AFL). The franchise did not fare much better after relocating. However in 2007, the Destroyers qualified for the playoffs as the sixth and lowest seed in the National Conference. They went on to defeat the conference's top three seeds that season, before losing ArenaBowl XXI 55–33. Prior to the 2009 season, the AFL announced that it had suspended operations indefinitely and canceled the 2009 season. After moving to Columbus, the Destroyers played its home games in Nationwide Arena.

References
General
 
 

Specific

Arena Football League seasons by team
Columbus Destroyers seasons
Ohio sports-related lists
New York (state) sports-related lists
Columbus, Ohio-related lists
Buffalo, New York-related lists